Jefferson Parish Public Schools is a school district based in Harvey in unincorporated Jefferson Parish, Louisiana, United States. The district operates all district public schools in Jefferson Parish. As of 2014 it had 47,000 students, making it the largest public school system in the state.

History
In 1981 it had about 61,000 students and 75 schools. By 2012 it had 81 schools but about 46,000. That year there was a proposal to close seven schools. Of the nine the Jefferson Parish School Board members, eight voted in favor of the closures and one voted against. The projected number of students to be moved was about 2,000.

Demographics
In the 2014–2015 school year the district had 48,126 students, 1,467 students (3%) higher than the enrollment of the previous school year. There were a total of 5,634 English Language Learners (ELL) students as part of the overall student enrollment for 2014–2015, and that had increased by about 1,200 (28%). Most of the additional students for 2014-2015 were Hispanic, and of them, most were Honduran. According to ELL director Karina Castillo the East Bank had more of the new students than the West Bank.

Academic performance
James K. Glassman of The Atlantic wrote in 1978 that the school system was of the same quality as that of New Orleans even though Jefferson Parish was wealthier than New Orleans; Glassman described Jefferson Parish as "one of the most poorly run rich counties in the United States."

In October 2009, the release of annual school performance scores by the Louisiana Department of Education revealed that Jefferson Parish's public school system posted its largest-ever increase in performance score, to 78.4, though the performance score remained significantly below the state average of 91. In 2011, according to state accountability rules, the district made a "D" grade. This increased to a "C" in 2012, and then a "B" on 2013, giving it the 36th highest score of the school districts in the state. This score applies to the 2012–2013 school year. Its Louisiana performance score was 85.9 of 150. In 2014 it continued having a "B" ranking, with its performance being 87.2 of 150.

By 2012 the district established a policy stating that if a principal does not reach academic goals in three years, the principal will be removed. In 2012 15 principals lost their jobs over this policy.

Operations
As of 2014 teachers who have large numbers of bilingual students and are fluent in either Spanish, Arabic, and Vietnamese may receive a $3,000 annual stipend and/or a $2,000 signing bonus.

Previously the district had an administrative building in Marrero for people living in the West Bank of the parish. It was proposed for closure and consolidation into the Harvey headquarters in 2012.

The teachers previously had a collective bargaining agreement but it expired in 2012. The school board did not wish to renew it. The Teacher Voice Advisory Council was created in 2013.

Schools

K-12 schools
 Grand Isle School  (Grand Isle)

6-12 schools
 Haynes Academy for Advanced Studies -Metairie, LA

Secondary schools

7-12 schools
Fisher Middle-High School  - Jean Lafitte

6-12 schools
(unzoned)
Patrick F. Taylor Science & Technology Academy  (Unincorporated, Jefferson)

High schools
East Bank
 Alfred Bonnabel High School  - Kenner
 East Jefferson High School - (Unincorporated, Metairie)
 Grace King High School - (Unincorporated, Metairie)
 Riverdale High School  - (Unincorporated, Jefferson)

West Bank
 Helen Cox High School - (Unincorporated, Harvey)
 John Ehret High School - (Unincorporated, near Marrero)
 L.W. Higgins High School  - (Unincorporated, Marrero)
 West Jefferson High School - (Unincorporated, Harvey)

Alternative high schools, West Bank
Jefferson High School  (Gretna)
 John Martyn Alternative School (Metairie, Louisiana)

Middle schools

East Bank
 John Q. Adams Middle School - (Unincorporated, Metairie)
 T. H. Harris Middle School - (Unincorporated, Metairie)
 Vernon and Gilda Haynes Academy for Advanced Studies - (Unincorporated, Metairie)
 J.D. Meisler Middle School - (Unincorporated, Metairie)
 Riverdale Middle School - (Unincorporated, Jefferson)
 Theodore Roosevelt Middle School - Kenner

West Bank
 Allen Ellender Middle School - (Unincorporated, Marrero)
 Henry Ford Middle School - (Unincorporated, Avondale)
 Gretna Middle School - Gretna
 Livaudais Middle School - (Unincorporated, Gretna address)
 Marrero Middle School - (Unincorporated, Marrero)
 Ruppel Academy for Advanced Studies - (Unincorporated, Gretna)
 Harry S. Truman Middle School - (Unincorporated Jefferson Parish, Marrero)
 Stella Worley Middle School - Westwego
 Jefferson RISE - Gretna

K-8 schools
K-8 schools:
 Kenner Discovery Health Science Academy/KDHSA - Kenner - By 2014 the school made attempts to recruit prospective students who were categorized as "at risk" (higher chance of failure) and black students. That year 58% of its students were deemed "at-risk". In 2014 the Jefferson Parish School Board approved allowing the school to expand. Its enrollment for 2015 was allowed to increase by 90 and that year it was allowed to include the 8th grade; the 7th grade was previously the highest.

Elementary schools

East Bank
Zoned
 Airline Park Academy for Advanced Studies - (Unincorporated, Metairie)
 A. C. Alexander Elementary School - Kenner
 John James Audubon Elementary School - Kenner
 Alice Birney Elementary School - (Unincorporated, Metairie)
 Bissonet Plaza Elementary School - (Unincorporated, Metairie)
 Bridgedale Elementary School - (Unincorporated, Metairie)
 Chateau Estates Elementary School - Kenner
 John Clancy Elementary School - Kenner
 Ella Dolhonde Elementary School - (Unincorporated, Metairie) - In 2011 it was ranked "D" under state accountability rules, and in 2014 it was ranked "A" under the same rules.
 J.C. Ellis Elementary School - (Unincorporated, Metairie) - In 2014 it was ranked "A" under state accountability rules.
 Greenlawn Terrace Elementary School - Kenner
 Green Park Elementary School - (Unincorporated, Metairie)
 Harahan Elementary School - Harahan
 Hazel Park Hilda Knoff Elementary School - (Unincorporated, River Ridge)
 Phoebe Hearst Elementary School - (Unincorporated, Metairie) - In 2014 it was ranked "A" under state accountability rules.
 Jefferson Elementary School - (Unincorporated, Jefferson)
 Harold Keller Elementary School - (Unincorporated, Metairie) - In 2014 it was ranked "A" under state accountability rules.
 Rudolph Matas Elementary School - (Unincorporated, Metairie)
 Marie B. Riviere Elementary School - (Unincorporated, Metairie) - Bucktown - In 2014 it was ranked "A" under state accountability rules.
 Walter G. Schneckenburger Elementary School - Kenner - In 2014 it was ranked "A" under state accountability rules.
 Washington Elementary School - Kenner
 Granville T. Woods Elementary School - Kenner
Unzoned
 Metairie Academy for Advanced Studies - (Unincorporated, Metairie)

West Bank
Zoned
 Ames Elementary School - (Unincorporated, Marrero)
 Geraldine Boudreaux Elementary School - (Unincorporated Jefferson Parish, Terrytown)
 Bridge City Elementary School - (Unincorporated, Bridge City)
 Joshua Butler Elementary School - (Unincorporated, Bridge City)
 Lucile Cherbonnier Elementary School (Unincorporated, Waggaman)
 George A. Cox Elementary School - (Unincorporated, Timberlane)
 Fred Douglass Elementary School - Gretna
 Estelle Elementary School - (Unincorporated, Marrero) - In 2012 it had 1,125 students, making it above capacity and the parish's largest elementary school. That year the district made rezoning plans.
 William Hart Elementary School - Gretna
 Congetta Trippe Janet Elementary School - (Unincorporated, Marrero)
 Shirley T. Johnson Gretna Park Elementary School - Gretna
 Leo E. Kerner Elementary School (formerly Jean Lafitte Elementary School) - Jean Lafitte - In 2011 it was ranked "D" under state accountability rules, and in 2014 it was ranked "A" under the same rules.
 Lincoln Elementary School - (Unincorporated, Marrero)
 Live Oak Manor Elementary School - (Unincorporated Jefferson Parish, Live Oak Manor)
 McDonogh #26 Elementary School - Gretna
 Ella C. Pittman Elementary School - (Unincorporated, Harvey)
 Vic A. Pitre Elementary School - Westwego
 Paul J. Solis Elementary School - (Unincorporated, Timberlane)
 Catherine Strehle Elementary School - (Unincorporated, Avondale)
 Terrytown Elementary School - (Unincorporated, Terrytown)
 Miller Wall Elementary School - (Unincorporated, Marrero)
 Westwego Elementary School - Westwego
 Woodland West Elementary School - (Unincorporated, Harvey)
 Woodmere Elementary School - (Unincorporated, Harvey)

Unzoned
 Gretna No. 2 Academy for Advanced Studies - Gretna
 Marrero Academy for Advanced Studies - Marrero

Kindergartens
 Harvey Kindergarten School (Unincorporated, Harvey)

Former schools
 2012 closures
They were:
 Ralph J. Bunche Accelerated Academy for High School Preparation - (Unincorporated, Metairie) - The closure plan called for the students to be moved to Bonnabel High.
 Homedale Elementary School - (Unincorporated, Harvey) - The closure plan called for students to be moved to McDonogh No. 26 Elementary.
 Joseph S. Maggiore, Sr. Elementary School - (Unincorporated, Metairie) - Area parents advocated for keeping Maggiore open. The closure plan called for students to be moved to Clancy, Green Park, and Woods.
 Kate Middleton Elementary School - Gretna - The closure plan called for some students to be moved to Hart Elementary and others to be moved to Terrytown Elementary. In the 2011–2012 school year, Middleton had 370 students. Some parents criticized the closure plans as the school district stated that 350 was the minimum enrollment for an optimally-run elementary school, but the district still chose to close Middleton. The school's performance under Louisiana accountability laws declined after 2008, with the 2010–2011 score being a "D−".
 Norbert Rillieux Elementary School - (Unincorporated, Waggaman) - The closure plan called for the students to be moved to Cherbonnier Elementary. In 2011 the school had 208 students.
 Bonella A. St. Ville Accelerated Academy - (Unincorporated, Harvey) - Initially Elm Grove Elementary School, it served as a neighborhood elementary campus, and in the pre-1970s racially segregated period it was for black children. It was renamed after formal principal Bonella A. St. Ville. It was later converted into an alternative middle school for students who were academically behind their peers. It had 144 students in 2012. The closure plan called for the program to be moved to Ehret High. There were area residents arguing that it instead should go back to being a neighborhood elementary school.
 Waggaman School - The closure plan called for the program to be moved to West Bank Community School.

External links

 Jefferson Parish Public Schools

References

Further reading
 
 
 
School districts in Louisiana
P